Thomas de Dent, Thomas Dyvelyn, Thomas Denton, or Thomas of Dublin (died after 1361) was an English-born cleric and judge who held high office in Ireland during the reign of King Edward III, and was praised as a diligent and hard-working Crown official, who damaged his health through overwork.

He was born at Dent, then in the West Riding of Yorkshire (now in Cumbria), and may have been the son of John de Dent. During his years in Ireland he was sometimes known as Thomas Dyvelyn, which was an early form of "Thomas of Dublin", or as Thomas Denton. He took holy orders, and became a clerk in the  Royal service. He is first heard of in 1331 as the defendant in a lawsuit for poaching and trespass at Ingleton, North Yorkshire brought by John, 3rd Lord Mowbray; John de Dent, who was possibly his father, was named as co-defendant.

Early Career
Lord  Mowbray's lawsuit against him in no way impeded his career as a lawyer. He came to Ireland to serve as King's Attorney (the office which was later called Serjeant-at-law, not Attorney General for Ireland) in 1331. He quickly became a trusted member of the Irish administration, and in 1332 was sent to Westminster to report on the crisis which led to the imprisonment of Maurice FitzGerald, 1st Earl of Desmond and other Anglo-Irish nobles.

Judge

In 1334 he was appointed a justice of the Court of Common Pleas (Ireland). He was transferred to the Court of King's Bench (Ireland) in 1337. He became Lord Chief Justice of Ireland in 1341, as part of a widespread reform of the Irish judiciary, which included the replacement of Irish-born personnel with English judges (this was a common remedy of the English Crown for complaints about the corruption and inefficiency of the Irish government, and on this occasion reflected the King's personal preference for English over Anglo-Irish  Crown servants). He later complained that for some time he sat on the  Court alone, with no puisne justices to assist him. He had returned to England by 1343, when he served on a Royal Commission at Kendal. In 1347 he was appointed to head a commission of oyer and terminer to investigate the activities of Hugh de Burgh, who was accused of "oppression", i.e. maladministration, as Lord Treasurer of Ireland.

He was appointed Chief Justice of the Irish Common Pleas, then often titled "Chief Justice of the Dublin Bench", and served in that office from 1344–58. In 1345 he received a rather stern communication from King Edward III and his Privy Council, concerning a case of assault brought by Margery Poe against John de la Pulle. John complained that the case had been repeatedly adjourned by Denton's colleagues Simon Fitz-Richard and John  Gernoun, "through the intervention of error", to John's great prejudice. Denton was ordered to examine the records and report to the Justiciar of Ireland, so that the Justiciar could take whatever action was necessary to remedy the injustice.

Denton stepped down as Chief Justice of the Pleas in 1358, due by his own account to his "infirmity". His salary, according to his own petition for payment of it, was seriously in arrears when he retired.

He was granted a lease for the term of his life of the royal manor of Esker, near Lucan in County Dublin in 1351: Esker was often leased out to royal servants who were in high favour with the Crown; the previous tenant had been Roget Darcy, Constable of Newcastle Mackynegan (presumably the same Roger who was briefly Justiciar of Ireland). In 1355, on his own petition, he was granted a special allowance of £13 for his "great and strange labours" in 1354-5, when he served as Chief Justice without any puisne judges to assist him, injuring his own heath thereby, and for his general diligence in the King's business.

Petition for payment of his salary

He is last heard of in 1361, when he was visiting England. He was still in the King's service, but probably retired soon afterwards. He may have been in some financial distress in his last years, judging by his petition to the English Parliament asking for payment of the sums due to him, which was evidently written shortly after he left office in 1358. According to the petition he was forced to step down as Chief Justice due to ill health, and his fees were now seriously in arrears. He requested that the arrears be paid from the King's Treasury in England, or any other suitable source.

References
Notes

Sources
Ball, F. Elrington The Judges in Ireland 1221-1921 London John Murray 1926
Close Rolls of Edward III 1345 and 1355
Hart, A. R. A History of the King's Serjeants-at-law in Ireland Dublin Four Courts Press 2000
Mackay, Ronan "Dent, Thomas" Cambridge Dictionary of Irish Biography 
Smyth, Constantine Joseph Chronicle of the Law Officers of Ireland Henry Butterworth London 1839

Lords chief justice of Ireland
People from Sedbergh
1361 deaths
Serjeants-at-law (Ireland)
People from Dent, Cumbria
14th-century Irish judges